SNH may refer to:
 Scottish Natural Heritage
 Stanthorpe Airport, IATA airport code "SNH"
 Organotin hydrides R4−nSnHn in organotin chemistry
 SNH48